Boom Boom, Boom Boom Boom and Boom Boom Boom Boom may refer to:

Animals

 Boom Boom Ox, a decorated ox used in Tamil Nadu, India for fortune-telling

As a nickname or stage name

People 
 Boom Boom (nickname)
 "Boom Boom Bundy", early stage name for American professional wrestler King Kong Bundy (born 1957)
 Bernie Geoffrion (1931–2006), Canadian ice hockey player
 Shahid Afridi (born 1980), Pakistani cricketer
 Sister Boom Boom (1955–2012), American drag queen and astrologer
 Lady Boom Boom, French-Canadian drag queen

Characters 
 Tabitha Smith or Boom Boom, a Marvel comic book superheroine
 Freddie "Boom Boom" Washington, played by Lawrence Hilton-Jacobs in the TV series Welcome Back, Kotter
 Luther "Boom Boom" Jackson, in the film The Fortune Cookie
 Boom Boom, a boss monster in the video game Super Mario Bros. 3
 Sonic "Boom Boom" Renaldi, a character in the Speed Racer film adaptation

Film and television 
 Boom Boom (film), a 1936 Looney Tunes short film
 Boom boom (1990 film), a Fernando Guillén Cuervo film
 "Boom Boom!", catchphrase of Basil Brush, a British TV character
 "Boom Boom!", a type of Sting (percussion) to punctuate a joke.

Music 
 Boom Boom Radio, a jazz oriented Albanian radio station
 Boom Boom, a type of Caribbean drum used in the music of the Virgin Islands
 Boom Boom Band, band of Willie Alexander and the Boom Boom Band 1978 New Wave album

Albums
 Boom Boom (album), a 1992 album by John Lee Hooker
 Boom Boom, a 2003 album and a tune by Norwegian/Swedish jazz group Atomic
 Boom! Boom! Boom!, an album by Kelley Deal 6000

Songs 
 "Boom Boom" (Cham song), 2005
 "Boom Boom" (Dareysteel song), 2014
 "Boom Boom" (Emmy song), 2011
 "Boom Boom" (John Lee Hooker song), 1961
 "Boom Boom" (Justice Crew song), 2012
 "Boom Boom" (Mabel song), 1978
 "Boom Boom" (Rye Rye song), 2012
 "Boom Boom" (RedOne song), 2017
 "Boom Boom" (Loboda and Pharaoh song), 2020
 "Boom Boom (Out Go the Lights)", a 1979 Pat Travers live single from the album Live! Go for What You Know
 "Boom, Boom", a 2019 song by Akon from El Negreeto
 "Boom Boom", a 2017 Iggy Azalea song from the Pitch Perfect 3: Original Motion Picture Soundtrack album
 "Boom Boom", a 2016 Đông Nhi song featuring Mei
 "Boom Boom", a 1982 song by Nazia and Zoheb from the album Star/Boom Boom
 "Boom Boom (Let's Go Back to My Room)", a 1987 song by Paul Lekakis
 "Boom Boom (Menudo Mix)", a track from the 2001 album Shhh! by Mexican-American cumbia group A.B. Quintanilla y Los Kumbia Kings
 "(I Got That) Boom Boom", from the 2003 album In the Zone by Britney Spears
 "Boom Boom", a song by The Wiggles from The Wiggles Movie Soundtrack
 "Boom Boom", a 2013 song by Brian Cross featuring Inna from the album PopStar
 "Boom Boom (Heartbeat)", a 2013 Ray Foxx ft. Rachel K Collier song
 "Boom Boom Boom", a dance song by the Outhere Brothers
 "Boom-Boom-Boom", a 2004 song by Rina Aiuchi
 "Boom, Boom, Boom, Boom!!", a 1999 song by Vengaboys
 "Boom Boom, Ain't It Great to Be Crazy?", a children's song

See also 
 
 Boom (disambiguation)
 Boomer (disambiguation)
 "Bom Bom", a 2012 song by Sam and the Womp
 "BBoom BBoom", a 2018 song by MOMOLAND